Alamere Falls is a waterfall in Point Reyes National Seashore, Marin County, California. Alamere Falls is a rare "tidefall", a waterfall that flows directly into the ocean. It is one of only two known tidefalls in California, the other being McWay Falls.

Alamere Falls tumble over fragile shale cliffs at Alamere Creek Beach. Upstream of the main Alamere Falls is the upper Alamere Falls, consisting of three separate cascades. All of these waterfalls are fed by the Alamere Creek.

Alamere Falls can be reached by following the Coast Trail from the Palomarin Trailhead at the end of Mesa Road out of Bolinas, California. After , the trail passes two small lakes (Bass Lake and Pelican Lake). Bass Lake can be accessed by a side trail that leads to a rope swing, and hikers often stop for a swim during summer months. This trail leads along the beach, check out the tides before to figure out the exact time for low tide. Usually, the beach to Alamere Falls is unsafe to access at high tide, and hikers are frequently trapped.

References

Waterfalls of California
Landforms of Marin County, California